Miguel Márquez Márquez (born 11 November 1968) is a Mexican politician affiliated with the PAN. He served as Governor of Guanajuato from 2012 to 2018. Prior to his governorship, Marquez was mayor (municipal president) of Purísima del Rincón.

References

External links
 Official website

1968 births
Living people
Politicians from Guanajuato
Governors of Guanajuato
National Action Party (Mexico) politicians
University of Salamanca alumni
21st-century Mexican politicians